HMS Winchelsea was a 32-gun fifth rate vessel built under contract at Redbridge (Southampton) in 1693/94. After commissioning she was employed for trade protection in the North Sea, guard ship at Plymouth, briefly with Shovell's Fleet in the Channel and a brief visit to the West Indies. While on fisheries protection in the Channel she was taken by the French off Hastings in June 1706.

She was the first vessel to bear the name Winchelsea or Winchelsey in the English and Royal Navy.

Construction and Specifications
She was ordered on 10 April 1693 to be built under contract by Mrs. Ann Wyatt of Redbridge (Southampton). She was launched on 13 August 1694. Her builder’s measure tonnage was calculated as 364 tons (burthen).

The gun armament initially was four demi-culverins mounted on wooden trucks on the lower deck (LD) with two pair of guns per side. The upper deck (UD) battery would consist of between twenty and twenty-two sakers guns mounted on wooden trucks with ten or eleven guns per side. The gun battery would be completed by four to six minions guns mounted on wooden trucks on the quarterdeck (QD) with two to three guns per side.

Commissioned service - 1694-1706
She was commissioned under the command of Captain James Littleton for service in the North Sea. In 1696 she was under Captain Francis Hosier (until 1698) still serving in the North Sea. She became a guard ship at Plymouth in 1698. Later in 1698 she was under Captain William Moses (until 1699) while remaining as guard ship. In 1701 she came under Captain Richard Short for service in Irish Waters. In 1702 under Captain George Smith she sailed with an eastern convoy. She then patrolled in the North Sea in 1703.On 7 February 1704 she was under Captain John Trotter assigned to Sir Cloudesley Shovell's Fleet in the English Channel. she sailed to the West Indies in the autumn. On 29 April 1705 she was under Captain William Gray until his death then was under Captain Henry Turville. She returned to Home Waters in July 1705. September 1705 she was under the command of Captain John Castle for fishery protection in the English Channel.

Loss
She was taken by four or five French privateers off Hastings on 6 June 1706. Captain Castle was killed during the action.

Notes

Citations

References

 Winfield (2009), British Warships in the Age of Sail (1603 – 1714), by Rif Winfield, published by Seaforth Publishing, England © 2009, EPUB 
 Colledge (2020), Ships of the Royal Navy, by J.J. Colledge, revised and updated by Lt Cdr Ben Warlow and Steve Bush, published by Seaforth Publishing, Barnsley, Great Britain, © 2020, EPUB 
 Lavery (1989), The Arming and Fitting of English Ships of War 1600 - 1815, by Brian Lavery, published by US Naval Institute Press © Brian Lavery 1989, Part V Guns, Type of Guns
 Clowes (1898), The Royal Navy, A History from the Earliest Times to the Present (Vol. II). London. England: Sampson Low, Marston & Company, © 1898

 

Frigates of the Royal Navy
Ships of the Royal Navy
1690s ships